Ianco is a Romanian language surname that stems from the male given name Jacob. Notable people with the name include:
Josine Ianco-Starrels (1926–2019), Romanian-born American art curator
Marcel Ianco (1895–1984), Romanian and Israeli visual artist, architect and art theorist

Romanian-language surnames
Surnames from given names